Wadi Amar Shabshab (born 26 February 1947) is a Mexican politician affiliated with the National Action Party. As of 2014 he served as Senator of the LVIII and LIX Legislatures of the Mexican Congress representing Quintana Roo.

In 2020 his family reported to the attorney general that he had been kidnapped, and he was rescued from a hotel in Playa del Carmen a few hours later.

References

1947 births
Living people
Politicians from Quintana Roo
People from Chetumal, Quintana Roo
Members of the Senate of the Republic (Mexico)
National Action Party (Mexico) politicians
21st-century Mexican politicians
20th-century Mexican people